SLRP may be an abbreviation for
Soluble low density lipoprotein receptor-related protein
Small leucine-rich repeat protein
Small leucine-rich repeat proteoglycan